Elections to Calderdale Metropolitan Borough Council were held on 6 May 1999.  One third of the council was up for election and the Labour party lost overall control of the council to no overall control. The overall turnout of the election was 30.09% (44,215 voters of an electorate of 146,944). The winning candidate in each ward is highlighted in bold.

After the election, the composition of the council was
Labour 20
Conservative 19
Liberal Democrats 14
Independent 1

Ward results

Brighouse ward

Calder Valley ward

Elland ward

Greetland and Stainland ward

Hipperholme and Lightcliffe ward

Illingworth ward

Luddendenfoot ward

Mixenden ward

Northowram and Shelf ward

Ovenden ward

Rastrick ward

Ryburn ward

Skircoat ward

Sowerby Bridge ward

St John's ward

Todmorden ward

Town ward

Warley ward

By-elections between 1999 and 2000

Elland ward, 1999

References

Election of District Councillors 1999 Calderdale Metropolitan Borough Council

1999
1999 English local elections
1990s in West Yorkshire